Watershed may refer to:

Hydrology
 Drainage divide, the line that separates neighbouring drainage basins
 Drainage basin, an area of land where surface water converges (North American usage)

Music
 Watershed Music Festival, an annual country music event in George, Washington, US

Bands
 Watershed (American band), rock band active since 1987
 Watershed (South African band), pop-rock band active since 1998

Works
 Watershed (Grant McLennan album), the debut solo album by Grant McLennan
 Watershed (k.d. lang album), the fifth solo studio album by k.d. lang
 Watershed (Opeth album), the ninth full-length studio album by Opeth
 "The Watershed", a song by Mark Hollis, from his eponymous album Mark Hollis
 "Watershed", a song on the album Nomads Indians Saints by the Indigo Girls
 "Wattershed", a song by Foo Fighters on their 1995 eponymous debut album
 Watershed, a 2022 oratorio based on the murder of George Duncan in Adelaide, South Australia

Places
 Watershed, Bristol, an arts and media venue in England
 Watershed College, a boarding school in Zimbabwe
 Watershed Distillery, Columbus, Ohio, US
 Watershed High School, Richfield, Minnesota, US
 Watershed mine, Far North Queensland, Australia
 Watershed Park,a large wooded public park in Olympia, Washington
 Watershed Trail, a ex-rail footpath from Roxana to Edwardsville in Illinois, US

Science and technology
 Watershed area (medical), an area with overlapping blood supply
 Watershed stroke, a stroke in a brain watershed
 Watershed (image processing), algorithms used in image processing
 Watershed LRS, a Learning Record Store and Learning Analytics Platform

Television and radio
 Watershed (broadcasting), a time of day when adult programming begins

See also
 Watershed district (disambiguation)
 Watersheddings, the site of a rugby league stadium